Zozan (also Romanized as Zūzan and Rūzān) is a village in Jolgeh Zozan District, Khaf County, Razavi Khorasan Province, Iran. At the 2006 census, its population was 2,183, in 479 families.

Zozan was the site of an ancient city. The historical city of Zozan (Zawzan) is located at a distance of 41 kilometers to the historical city of Khargard and is like a rectangular onion. Its ancient castle stands in the southern side and the chief mosque- belonging to Khwarazmi period with two-balconied plan- stands in the western side of the city.

This site is on the Iranian tentative list for UNESCO World Heritage nomination.

Notable people
 Hamza ibn Ali ibn Ahmad, founding leader of the Druze.
 Abu Sahl Zawzani, Persian statesman who served as the chief secretary of the Ghaznavids briefly in 1040, and later from 1041 to an unknown date was from Zozan.

Citations

Sources

Populated places in Khaf County